

Events

January events 
 January 5 – Bombay, Baroda and Central India Railway opens its Bombay suburban electrified system on 1.5 kV DC.
 January 13 – Henry Clay Hall leaves the Interstate Commerce Commission upon the appointment of his successor.

April events 
 April 10 – Takagimachi Station, in Matsushima, Miyagi, Japan, opens.

May events 

June events 
 June 13 - The first tests are performed with the first rail detector car, invented by Elmer Ambrose Sperry, in Beacon, New York.
 June 27 - Darlington rail crash on the London and North Eastern Railway in England: Two trains collide head-on at Darlington Bank Top railway station in County Durham following a signal passed at danger; 25 killed.
 June 28 - The International Railway (New York–Ontario) switches to one-man crews for its trolleys in Canada.

July events 
 July 10 - Shin-Koiwa Station in Katsushika, Tokyo, Japan, opens.
 July 18 - Official opening of the Pau–Canfranc railway line as a trans-Pyreneen route between France and Spain, and of Canfranc International Railway Station in Aragon.

September events 
 September 1 
 Frontier Mail express passenger service between Colaba Terminus (Bombay) and Peshawar inaugurated by Bombay, Baroda and Central India Railway.
 The Philadelphia Broad Street Line begins service between City Hall and Olney Avenue.
 September 22 - Canadian Premier John Bracken drives the last spike on Canadian National Railway's line between Flin Flon and Cranberry Portage, Manitoba.
 September 28 - Third class sleeping cars are introduced on those British railways providing such a service.

October events
 October 13 – Charfield railway disaster: London, Midland and Scottish Railway night mail train crashes into shunting goods train following signal passed at danger at Charfield in the English county of Gloucestershire: 16 killed.
 October 15 – The Loenga–Alnabru Line in Norway introduces electric traction.

November events
 November 1 - New Keihan Railway Line, Tenjinbashisuji-Rokuchome Station of Osaka to Sanin station of Kyoto route officially completed in Japan.(as predecessor of Hankyu Kyoto Line) 
 November 15 - Nara Electronic Railway Line, Kyōto Station to Yamato-Saidaiji Station of Nara route officially completed in Japan.(as predecessor of Kintetsu Kyoto Line)      
 November 28 - After both the eastbound and westbound passenger trains depart, a fire is discovered in the Grand Trunk Pacific Railway's Wainwright, Alberta, station; due to problems with the local fire truck, the station is completely destroyed in the blaze.
 November 29 - The last trains on Pacific Great Eastern Railway's (predecessor of British Columbia Railway) Vancouver-Horseshoe Bay line are run.
 The Merchants Despatch purchases the Northern Refrigerator Car Line (founded by Milwaukee's Cudahy brothers) and its 1,800 cars.

December events
 December – Great Western Railway of England commences series production at its Swindon Works of ’Hall’ Class 4-6-0 steam locomotives, of which there will eventually be 339.

Unknown date events

 The Chicago, Milwaukee, and St. Paul, a predecessor of the Milwaukee Road, changes its name to Chicago, Milwaukee, St. Paul & Pacific after a reorganization.
 William Sproule steps down from the presidency of the Southern Pacific Company, the parent company of the Southern Pacific Railroad.  The position remains open until 1929.
 Hale Holden succeeds Henry deForest as Chairman of the Executive Committee for the Southern Pacific Company, the parent company of the Southern Pacific Railroad.
 The Boston, Revere Beach and Lynn Railroad, in Massachusetts, converts from steam locomotive power to electric power, adding motors, electrical equipment and controls to its passenger cars.
 The Atlantic Coast Line Railroad completes the last section of the Perry Cutoff, creating a more direct route between Chicago and Florida's west coast.
 The last new PRR K4s Pacific is built.
 Deutsche Reichsbahn-Gesellschaft Class ET 165 "Stadtbahn" electric multiple units for Berlin S-Bahn introduced; the class will remain in commuter service into the 1990s.
 The Atchison, Topeka and Santa Fe Railway acquires the Kansas City, Mexico and Orient Railway.

Births

March births 
 March 14 – Richard Marsh, Baron Marsh, chairman of British Rail 1971–1976, is born (d. 2011).

October births 
 October 3 – Edward L. Moyers, president of MidSouth Rail and Illinois Central Railroad, chairman and CEO of Southern Pacific Railroad, "Railroader of the Year" for 1995, is born (d. 2006).

Deaths

April deaths 
 April 5 - Chauncey Depew, president of New York Central Railroad (born 1834).

July deaths 
 July 8 – Howard Elliott, president of Northern Pacific Railway 1903–1913, president of New York, New Haven and Hartford Railroad beginning in 1913, dies (b. 1860).
 July 30 - Job A. Edson, president of Kansas City Southern Railway 1905-1918 and 1920–1927, dies (born 1854).

References
 Colin Churcher's Railway Pages (August 16, 2005), Significant dates in Canadian railway history. Retrieved September 22, 2005.
 Santa Fe Railroad (1945), Along Your Way, Rand McNally, Chicago, Illinois